Aleksander Myszuga (June 20, 1853 – March 9, 1922) (sometimes spelled Ołeksandr Mishuga or Olexander Myshuga) was a Ukrainian operatic tenor and voice teacher of Ukrainian descent. He studied voice with 
Walery Wysocki in Lviv and with Giovanni Sbriglia in Paris. During the last two decades of the 19th century and the first decade of the 20th century he performed with major European opera houses, including making appearances at the Grand Theatre in Warsaw, the Mariinsky Theatre, the Paris Opera, and the Vienna State Opera. After retiring from the stage, he taught singing in Kiev from 1905 to 1911 and then in Warsaw from 1911 to 1914. He established a music school in Stockholm in 1918.

References

Ukrainian operatic tenors
Voice teachers
Lviv Conservatory alumni
1853 births
1922 deaths
19th-century male opera singers from the Russian Empire